is a train station in Ube, Yamaguchi Prefecture, Japan.

Lines
The station is served by the JR West Ube Line and Onoda Line.

Station layout
The unattended station consists of two side platform serving two tracks. The station building is located east of the platforms and is connected via an overpass. The Ube-direction side platform used to be an island platform serving two tracks but one side has been fenced off.

Platforms

History
The station opened on 16 May, 1929.

References

External links

  

Railway stations in Yamaguchi Prefecture
Railway stations in Japan opened in 1929